Japanese musician Miyavi has released 15 studio albums, 2 EPs and 41 singles as of 2022. Chart rankings are weekly, unless otherwise stated.

Studio albums

EPs

Compilation albums

Remix albums

Live albums

Singles

As a lead artist

Other charted songs

Charitable works

 A Piece of Water  (iTunes Store, December 6, 2006)
 "Christmas is..."
 "Entre la soledad y el recuerdo" (guitars) 
 Nippon Shiyouzi Noriko Rock Selection - Fankimonkibaibureshon ~Solo~ (君にファンキーモンキーバイブレーション~独奏?~, January 24, 2007)

Videography 

 Gekokujou (激レア, Live concert, July 23, 2003)
 Hitorigei (一人芸, Music video compilation, August 21, 2004)
 Indies Last Live in Nihon Budokan (インディーズ・ラスト LIVE in 日本武道館, Live concert, December 1, 2004)
 Noriko no Ichi (のり子の一日, Live documentary, January 12, 2005)
 Hitorigei 2 (一人芸2, Music video compilation, December 7, 2005)
 Hitorigei 3 (一人芸3, Music video compilation, December 20, 2006)
 25 Shunen Kinen Koen Tokyo Geijutsu Gekijo 5 Days -Dokuso- (25周年記念公演・東京芸術劇場５days 〜独奏〜, Live concert, May 2, 2007)
 The Beginning of Neo Visualizm Tour 2007 (Live concert, May 7, 2008)
 Official Bootleg Live at Shinkiba Coast (Live concert, May 7, 2008)
 This Iz The Original Samurai Style (Music video compilation, December 24, 2008)
 Neo Tokyo Samurai Black World Tour vol.1 (Tour Documentary, March 24, 2010)
 Miyavi, The Guitar Artist Slap The World Tour 2014 (September 10, 2014)

References

Discographies of Japanese artists